Gilbert de Botton (16 February 1935 – 27 August 2000) was an Egyptian-Israeli-Swiss financial pioneer, who is considered the inventor of the open architecture model of asset management, whereby a financial institution offers third party products to their clients. He was also a prominent art collector.

Early life
Gilbert de Botton was born in Alexandria, Egypt, to a distinguished Sephardic Jewish family. Among his ancestors was the rabbinical scholar Abraham de Boton. Gilbert was brought up largely by his mother's parents. His mother Yolande Harmer, a journalist and Israeli intelligence officer, died in 1959. He also saw little of his father, who was an oil company representative.

De Botton was educated at Victoria College, Alexandria; the Hebrew University of Jerusalem, where he studied economics; and Columbia University in the US, where he earned a master's degree.

Career
In 1968, when the British and French Rothschild banking houses decided jointly to establish an operation in Zurich, de Botton was recruited as its first managing director. He went on to serve briefly as president of Rothschilds in New York in 1982.

In 1983, Gilbert de Botton founded the Global Asset Management financial firm, a multinational asset management firm, later incorporated into UBS AG until December 2005, when it was acquired by Julius Baer. Upon selling his stakes in the company in 1999, de Botton received a large sum of money, whose size has never been officially confirmed by buyer or seller. His wealth was estimated by one source to have reached £234 million in 1999.

In 2003, GAM and the London School of Economics and Political Science (LSE) announced the creation of the GAM Gilbert de Botton Award in Finance Research, an annual award given in recognition of outstanding research in finance, in honour of Gilbert de Botton.

Personal life
Gilbert de Botton married Jacqueline Burgauer in 1962. The marriage was dissolved in 1988. They had two children: a son, the writer Alain de Botton, and a daughter, Miel de Botton, a philanthropist and art collector. In 1990, he married Janet Green (née Wolfson), the eldest daughter of businessman Leonard Wolfson, Baron Wolfson, of the Great Universal Stores family, and previously married to broadcasting executive Michael Green. Dame Janet de Botton is also a prominent collector of modern art.

References

External links
David Landau, "Gilbert de Botton: Self-made financier who revelled in money, markets and modern art". The Guardian, obituaries, Wednesday 20 September 2000.
"Gilbert de Botton", The Telegraph, obituaries, 30 Aug 2000.

British art collectors
British financial businesspeople
British Sephardi Jews
Egyptian Sephardi Jews
Columbia University alumni
Hebrew University of Jerusalem alumni
2000 deaths
1935 births
Victoria College, Alexandria alumni
20th-century Egyptian economists